Eklavya Sports Stadium is a multi purpose stadium located in Agra, Uttar Pradesh. The ground is mainly used for organizing matches of football, cricket and other sports. The stadium has hosted 17 Ranji Trophy match  in 1934 when United Provinces cricket team played against Delhi cricket team as the match saw Delhi all out for 37 runs in the first innings. The hosted 16 more matches from 1966 to 1987 but since then the stadium hasn't hosted any cricket matches.

References

External links 
 cricketarchive
 cricinfo

Defunct cricket grounds in India
Cricket grounds in Uttar Pradesh
Sports venues in Uttar Pradesh
Buildings and structures in Agra
Sports venues completed in 1934
1934 establishments in India
Sport in Agra
20th-century architecture in India